Jim Grisham (December 4, 1942 – July 30, 2012) was an American football fullback and linebacker, who played at the University of Oklahoma from 1961 to 1964.

Early years
Grisham attended Olney High School, where he played quarterback, End, halfback and fullback. As a junior in 1959, he played halfback, helping the team reach the Texas Class 2A semifinal. 

As a senior in 1960, he was named the starter at fullback after Harold Phillip graduated. He led his team to a second straight semifinal appearance, while scoring 21 touchdowns and earning All-state honors.

College career
Grisham accepted a football scholarship from the University of Oklahoma, to play under head coach Bud Wilkinson. As a sophomore, he posted 147 carries for 711 yards (4.8-yard average) and 8 touchdowns.

As a junior in 1963, he was named a Consensus All-American, playing both offense (fullback) and defense (linebacker). He tallied 153 carries for 861 yards (5.6-yard average) and 8 touchdowns. He rushed for 218 yards and scored 4 touchdowns against Oklahoma State University in the Bedlam Series. He finished second in the Big Eight Conference in rushing behind Gale Sayers.

As a senior, Gomer Jones became the new football head coach of the Sooners. Grisham registered 146 carries for 725 yards (5.0-yard average) and 3 touchdowns, finishing second in the Big Eight Conference in rushing behind Walt Garrison. He was one of four Sooners stars who missed the 1965 Gator Bowl game against Florida State University. Grisham, offensive lineman Ralph Neely, halfback Lance Rentzel and end Wes Skidgel signed with professional teams before the game, and were ruled ineligible for the contest, which Florida State University won 36–19 on the strength of four touchdown catches by Fred Biletnikoff.

Grisham rushed for a school record 2,297 career yards, including a 5.2 yards per carry average and 19 touchdowns in his college career.

Professional career
Grisham was selected by the Minnesota Vikings during the sixth round in 1965 NFL Draft. He was also selected by the Houston Oilers in the 17th round of the 1965 AFL Draft. He opted to sign with the Vikings and was waived on August 2.

References

External links
 All-American: Jim Grisham

1942 births
2012 deaths
Players of American football from Houston
American football fullbacks
Oklahoma Sooners football players
All-American college football players